The 1995 elections to Argyll and Bute Council were held on 6 April 1995 and were the first for the newly formed unitary authority, which was created under the Local Government etc (Scotland) Act 1994 and replaced the previous two-tier system of local government under Strathclyde Regional Council and Dumbarton and Argyll & Bute District Councils.

Election results

Ward results

References

External links

1995 Scottish local elections
1995